Dude Bro Party Massacre III is a 2015 American satirical slasher film created by the comedy troupe 5-Second Films. It was directed by Jon Salmon, Michael Rousselet, and Tomm Jacobsen. Despite the title, it is not a sequel, and there are no previous installments, being a parody of the Massacre franchise. Presented as a lost film that was banned in the 1980s, it tells the story of a masked killer known as Motherface, who targets fraternity brothers.

Plot 
Delta Bi member Brock Chirino talks to his therapist about the multiple slasher-related attacks on his fraternity because of their pranks. The sorority house mother was trapped in a burning building and vowed revenge on them during one. While member Road Doggie loses his frisbee outside, the mother throws a buzzsaw at his mouth, partially decapitating him. Inside, Cindy performs oral sex on C-Trunk, only for the mother to sneak under the bed and kill them both with a harpoon, before stabbing Coach Handsey with a javelin in the locker room. The mother goes on a rampage, hacking one to death in the shower with two meat cleavers, stabbing one through the mouth with a javelin, and decapitating one with a machete. After Scooter's head explodes, Brock and his friend Samzy manage to kill the mother, only for her daughter to cut off her face and use it as a mask, taking up the name Motherface.

Motherface begins her own rampage, slashing people's throats and electrocuting them, even killing the Delta Bi's weed dealer Tito by hacking him in the throat with a wooden sign. After shredding Dolphman's face with a blender, Brock lights Motherface on fire and kills her. In the present day, the therapist grabs a pair of scissors and, revealing herself to be the new Motherface and the previous Motherface's sister, slashes Brock's throat. Brock's brother Brent joins Delta Bi while trying to discover his brother's killer. He befriends a crippled Nedry, Samzy, Derek, Todd, and his girlfriend Samantha, Turbeaux, who is scared of dogs, ZQ, Sizzler, Turtleneck, Flannel Bro, and a beer addicted Spike. During a prank, Nedry and Brent accidentally cause a plane crash, which makes Pepperstone recap their previous pranks, which include blowing up a dam in Old Parchtown. Because of the plane crash, Dean Pepperstone sends Delta Bi to the lake house. After they leave, Motherface stabs Pepperstone to death.

Delta Bi meets with the river raft salesman, Paddy, whose family died during a flood caused in the past by Delta Bi. Delta Bi gets the rafts and leaves behind Nedry. They arrive at the house and begin to clean it up. Motherface spies Paddy on a raft and almost shoots him with an arrow, only for Paddy to commit suicide by shooting himself through the mouth. Later at the house, Brent goes into the attic and finds Samzy, who tries to dance with Brent, only for Brent to accidentally drop his head on the floor, snapping his neck. Motherface cuts the power, and Delta Bi sends Derek to fix it. Motherface rams a hoe into the back of Derek's head, pushing it into the circuit and electrocuting him to death. She ambushes Spike, trying to find more beer, and kills him by stabbing him in the head with a beer tap and draining his brains. She also makes him drink his own blood.

Samantha and Todd have sex in a tent before Motherface stabs Todd through the tent with a machete. Samantha is oblivious and falls asleep. ZQ and Sizzler go into the woods, and a tree crushes ZQ before Motherface bisects him. The next day, Delta Bi finds ZQ's corpse and runs into the house, with Turbeaux knocking out Samantha with a baseball bat. Samzy reveals that he has a robot duplicate in the attic, but Brent realizes that he has killed him. Motherface throws his head through the window and uses a device to make Samzy rip out his tongue by the lake before drowning him. Motherface then rips out Sizzler's heart and flushes his insides down a toilet.

Turbeaux is locked in a room full of dogs and uses a gun to shoot himself. Samantha finds Sizzler's body and reveals to Brent that Todd impregnated her before Motherface appears behind her with a fire poker and stabs her through the stomach, killing her child. Motherface then pulls the poker up, vertically slicing Samantha in half. Brent finds a badly wounded Flannel and Turtleneck Bro in the woods before Motherface stabs both of their heads with a javelin. Motherface attacks Brent with a tomahawk, but Nedry saves him, only for Motherface to throw a tomahawk into Nedry's head, killing him. The spirits of all the dead Delta Bi strengthen Brent, and he uses the power to beat Motherface to death.

Cast 

Andrew W.K., John Francis Daley, Larry King, and TomSka appear in cameos.

Production 
The film is comedy troupe 5-Second Films' first feature and is a standalone film without any previous installments.  It is based on a five-second short.  When this proved popular, they created a fake trailer.  To finance a feature-length adaptation, 5-Second Films launched a $200,000 crowdfunding campaign.  The whole comedy troupe was assigned writing duties, but they were restricted from collaborating with each other. Alec Owen assembled the screenplay from the disparate scenes to create the first draft, and was named as the film's head writer to complete the final screenplay.  There was a good deal of improv on set that made it into the final movie.  Oswalt had previously collaborated with the troupe on short films,  and Sestero knew co-director Rousselet through Rousselet's promotion of The Room as a cult film.  Owen said Dude Bro was a reaction to how other films glorified objectionable behavior.  Written as "a sort of feminist film", it was intentionally designed to fail the Bechdel test to satirize the sexism that dominated the preceding films of its genre.

Release 
Dude Bro Party Massacre III premiered at the Los Angeles Film Festival on June 13, 2015.  It was released digitally on July 7.

Reception 
Rotten Tomatoes, a review aggregator, reports that 92% of 12 surveyed critics gave the film a positive review; the average rating is 7.2/10. Carlos Aguilar of IndieWire wrote, "Its form and its ideas come together in a disgusting, profane, vulgar, and psychotic concoction that will become, without a doubt, an instant cult classic." Elijah Taylor of Fangoria rated it 3/4 stars and wrote that it "managed to exceed or subvert nearly every expectation I had". At Bloody Disgusting, Patrick Cooper rated the film 4/5 stars and wrote, "The jokes hit hard and fast and the whole film's quotable as hell." In rating it 2/5 stars, Matt Boiselle of Dread Central recommended it only to fans of "low-budgeted campy slashers". Comparing it to Wet Hot American Summer, Mark L. Miller of Ain't It Cool News called it "some of the dumbest fun you're going to have while watching a horror film this year".

On October 7th, 2022, YouTube channel Dead Meat awarded the directors as the Kill Count Champions with 4,295 kills.

References

External links 
 
 

2015 films
2015 comedy horror films
2015 independent films
2010s parody films
2010s satirical films
2010s slasher films
American comedy horror films
American independent films
American parody films
American satirical films
American slasher films
Crowdfunded films
Films about fraternities and sororities
Films about fratricide and sororicide
Parodies of horror
Slasher comedy films
2010s English-language films
2010s American films